Diego Armando Palomeque Echavarría (born 5 December 1993 in Apartadó, Antioquia) is a Colombian sprinter.

Career
He tied Aldemir da Silva Junior for the 200 metres title at the 2011 South American Junior Championships in Athletics.

On 28 April 2012, Palomeque broke the Colombian National Junior Record in the 400 metres with 45.62, thereby also meeting the 'B'-Standard to qualify for the 2012 Summer Olympics. He was initially suspended and later excluded from the games after testing positive for exogenous testosterone.  
He was banned for two years between 12.08.2012 and 11.08.2014.

He competed at the 2020 Summer Olympics.

Personal bests
100 m: 10.11 s (wind: +1.9 m/s) –  Asunción, 23 June 2017
200 m: 20.32 s (wind: +0.5 m/s) –  Medellín, 11 June 2017
400 m: 45.25 s A–  Medellín, 30 April 2016

Achievements 

1Did not start in the semifinals

References

External links

1993 births
Living people
Colombian male sprinters
Doping cases in athletics
Colombian sportspeople in doping cases
Athletes (track and field) at the 2015 Pan American Games
Athletes (track and field) at the 2019 Pan American Games
Pan American Games gold medalists for Colombia
Pan American Games medalists in athletics (track and field)
Athletes (track and field) at the 2016 Summer Olympics
Olympic athletes of Colombia
World Athletics Championships athletes for Colombia
Athletes (track and field) at the 2018 South American Games
South American Games gold medalists for Colombia
South American Games medalists in athletics
Central American and Caribbean Games bronze medalists for Colombia
Competitors at the 2014 Central American and Caribbean Games
Competitors at the 2018 Central American and Caribbean Games
People from Apartadó
Central American and Caribbean Games medalists in athletics
Medalists at the 2019 Pan American Games
South American Games gold medalists in athletics
Athletes (track and field) at the 2020 Summer Olympics
Sportspeople from Antioquia Department
21st-century Colombian people